Oncideres rhodosticta is a species of beetle in the family Cerambycidae. It was described by Henry Walter Bates in 1885. It is known from the United States and Mexico.

References

rhodosticta
Beetles described in 1885